Vice-Admiral Joseph Alphonse Denis Rouleau  is a retired officer who served in the Royal Canadian Navy.

Career
Rouleau completed a bachelor's degree in engineering and management at the Royal Military College of Canada and attended the Canadian Forces College, graduating the Advanced Military Studies Course and the National Security Studies Course.

After serving in various administrative positions at the National Defence Headquarters, he took command of the multi-national Standing NATO Maritime Group One before heading back to Ottawa.

From June 15, 2008, until July 25, 2010, Rouleau served as the Vice Chief of the Defence Staff.

Rouleau's last posting from August 2010 until his retirement in 2012 was as Canada's military representative to the North Atlantic Treaty Organization.

Awards and decorations
Rouleau's personal awards and decorations include the following:
File:Special Service Medal Ribbon.png

References 

Royal Military College of Canada alumni
Royal Canadian Navy officers
Canadian admirals
Vice Chiefs of the Defence Staff (Canada)
Commanders of the Order of Military Merit (Canada)
Recipients of the Meritorious Service Decoration
Living people
Year of birth missing (living people)